Chorisochismus dentex, the rocksucker or giant clingfish, is a species of clingfish found along the coast of southern Africa from Namibia to northern Natal, South Africa. It inhabits the intertidal and  subtidal zones in shallow reefs and rock pools. This species is the only known member of its genus.

It varies in colour, but is typically mottled greenish or reddish. Dead and dried C. dentex are occasionally found by beachcombers, and their often red colour combined with their strange shape and proportionally large teeth have caused some to describe them as "sea monsters".

Feeding varies with age. Juveniles mostly feed on small crustaceans. Adults are specialized feeders of patellid limpets (almost 75% of their diet), but also take significant quantities of other sea snails and sea urchins, and low levels of chitons. Limpets are typically strongly attached to the rock surface and are difficult to dislodge. First the fish perches next to its prey. It then rapidly lunges forward and up, dives down with its mouth open, inserts its relatively large, fang-like upper front teeth below the edge of the limpet and flips it. It is immediately swallowed whole and the entire sequence typically only lasts about one second. The prey can be quite large compared to the size of the fish. A  C. dentex contained a  limpet.

References

Gobiesocidae
Taxa named by Charles N. F. Brisout
Monotypic ray-finned fish genera